In the geometry of tessellations, a rep-tile or reptile is a shape that can be dissected into smaller copies of the same shape. The term was coined as a pun on animal reptiles by recreational mathematician Solomon W. Golomb and popularized by Martin Gardner in his "Mathematical Games" column in the May 1963 issue of Scientific American. In 2012 a generalization of rep-tiles called self-tiling tile sets was introduced by Lee Sallows in Mathematics Magazine.

Terminology

A rep-tile is labelled rep-n if the dissection uses n copies. Such a shape necessarily forms the prototile for a tiling of the plane, in many cases an aperiodic tiling. 
A rep-tile dissection using different sizes of the original shape is called an irregular rep-tile or irreptile. If the dissection uses n copies, the shape is said to be irrep-n. If all these sub-tiles are of different sizes then the tiling is additionally described as perfect. A shape that is rep-n or irrep-n is trivially also irrep-(kn − k + n) for any k > 1, by replacing the smallest tile in the rep-n dissection by n even smaller tiles. The order of a shape, whether using rep-tiles or irrep-tiles is the smallest possible number of tiles which will suffice.

Examples

Every square, rectangle, parallelogram, rhombus, or triangle is rep-4. The sphinx hexiamond (illustrated above) is rep-4 and rep-9, and is one of few known self-replicating pentagons. The Gosper island is rep-7. The Koch snowflake is irrep-7: six small snowflakes of the same size, together with another snowflake with three times the area of the smaller ones, can combine to form a single larger snowflake.

A right triangle with side lengths in the ratio 1:2 is rep-5, and its rep-5 dissection forms the basis of the aperiodic pinwheel tiling.

Rectangles in this shape are rep-2. A rectangle (or parallelogram) is rep-n if its aspect ratio is :1. An isosceles right triangle is also rep-2.

Rep-tiles and symmetry

Some rep-tiles, like the square and equilateral triangle, are symmetrical and remain identical when reflected in a mirror. Others, like the sphinx, are asymmetrical and exist in two distinct forms related by mirror-reflection. Dissection of the sphinx and some other asymmetric rep-tiles requires use of both the original shape and its mirror-image.

Rep-tiles and polyforms

Some rep-tiles are based on polyforms like polyiamonds and polyominoes, or shapes created by laying equilateral triangles and squares edge-to-edge.

Squares

If a polyomino is rectifiable, that is, able to tile a rectangle, then it will also be a rep-tile, because the rectangle will have an integer side length ratio and will thus tile a square. This can be seen in the octominoes, which are created from eight squares. Two copies of some octominoes will tile a square; therefore these octominoes are also rep-16 rep-tiles.

Four copies of some nonominoes and nonakings will tile a square, therefore these polyforms are also rep-36 rep-tiles.

Equilateral triangles

Similarly, if a polyiamond tiles an equilateral triangle, it will also be a rep-tile.

Right triangles

A right triangle is a triangle containing one right angle of 90°. Two particular forms of right triangle have attracted the attention of rep-tile researchers, the 45°-90°-45° triangle and the 30°-60°-90° triangle.

45°-90°-45° triangles

Polyforms based on isosceles right triangles, with sides in the ratio 1 : 1 : , are known as polyabolos. An infinite number of them are rep-tiles. Indeed, the simplest of all rep-tiles is a single isosceles right triangle. It is rep-2 when divided by a single line bisecting the right angle to the hypotenuse. Rep-2 rep-tiles are also rep-2n and the rep-4,8,16+ triangles yield further rep-tiles. These are found by discarding half of the sub-copies and permutating the remainder until they are mirror-symmetrical within a right triangle. In other words, two copies will tile a right triangle. One of these new rep-tiles is reminiscent of the fish formed from three equilateral triangles.

30°-60°-90° triangles

Polyforms based on 30°-60°-90° right triangles, with sides in the ratio 1 :  : 2, are known as polydrafters. Some are identical to polyminoes and polyiamonds, others are distinct.

Multiple and variant rep-tilings

Many of the common rep-tiles are rep- for all positive integer values of . In particular this is true for three trapezoids including the one formed from three equilateral triangles, for three axis-parallel hexagons (the L-tromino, L-tetromino, and P-pentomino), and the sphinx hexiamond. In addition, many rep-tiles, particularly those with higher rep-n, can be self-tiled in different ways. For example, the rep-9 L-tetramino has at least fourteen different rep-tilings. The rep-9 sphinx hexiamond can also be tiled in different ways.

Rep-tiles with infinite sides

The most familiar rep-tiles are polygons with a finite number of sides, but some shapes with an infinite number of sides can also be rep-tiles. For example, the teragonic triangle, or horned triangle, is rep-4. It is also an example of a fractal rep-tile.

Pentagonal rep-tiles

Triangular and quadrilateral (four-sided) rep-tiles are common, but pentagonal rep-tiles are rare. For a long time, the sphinx was widely believed to be the only example known, but the German/New-Zealand mathematician Karl Scherer and the American mathematician George Sicherman have found more examples, including a double-pyramid and an elongated version of the sphinx. These pentagonal rep-tiles are illustrated on the Math Magic pages overseen by the American mathematician Erich Friedman. However, the sphinx and its extended versions are the only known pentagons that can be rep-tiled with equal copies.
See Clarke's Reptile pages.

Rep-tiles and fractals

Rep-tiles as fractals

Rep-tiles can be used to create fractals, or shapes that are self-similar at smaller and smaller scales. A rep-tile fractal is formed by subdividing the rep-tile, removing one or more copies of the subdivided shape, and then continuing recursively. For instance, the Sierpinski carpet is formed in this way from a rep-tiling of a square into 27 smaller squares, and the Sierpinski triangle is formed  from a rep-tiling of an equilateral triangle into four smaller triangles. When one sub-copy is discarded, a rep-4 L-triomino can be used to create four fractals, two of which are identical except for orientation.

Fractals as rep-tiles

Because fractals are self-similar on smaller and smaller scales, many may be decomposed into copies of themselves like a rep-tile. However, if the fractal has an empty interior, this decomposition may not lead to a tiling of the entire plane. For example, the Sierpinski triangle is rep-3, tiled with three copies of itself, and the Sierpinski carpet is rep-8, tiled with eight copies of itself, but repetition of these decompositions does not form a tiling. On the other hand, the dragon curve is a space-filling curve with a non-empty interior; it is rep-4, and does form a tiling. Similarly, the Gosper island is rep-7, formed from the space-filling Gosper curve, and again forms a tiling.

By construction, any fractal defined by an iterated function system of n contracting maps of the same ratio is rep-n.

Infinite tiling

Among regular polygons, only the triangle and square can be dissected into smaller equally sized copies of themselves. However, a regular hexagon can be dissected into six equilateral triangles, each of which can be dissected into a regular hexagon and three more equilateral triangles. This is the basis for an infinite tiling of the hexagon with hexagons. The hexagon is therefore an irrep-∞ or irrep-infinity irreptile.

See also
 Mosaic
 Self-replication
 Self-tiling tile set
 Reptiles (M. C. Escher)

Notes

References

External links

Rep-tiles 

Mathematics Centre Sphinx Album: http://mathematicscentre.com/taskcentre/sphinx.htm
 Clarke, A. L. "Reptiles." http://www.recmath.com/PolyPages/PolyPages/Reptiles.htm. 

http://www.uwgb.edu/dutchs/symmetry/reptile1.htm  (1999)
IFStile - program for finding rep-tiles: https://ifstile.com

Irrep-tiles 
Math Magic - Problem of the Month 10/2002 
Tanya Khovanova - L-Irreptiles

Tessellation
Fractals